The surname Froidevaux may refer to:

 Camille Froidevaux-Metterie (born 1968), French philosopher, researcher and professor
 Etienne Froidevaux (born 1989), Swiss professional ice hockey player
 Francis Froidevaux (born 1971), retired Swiss football defender
 Robin Froidevaux (born 1998), Swiss road and track cyclist
 Stéphane Froidevaux, French chef